Adaptive Gabor representation (AGR) is a Gabor representation of a signal where its variance is adjustable. There's always a trade-off between time resolution and frequency resolution in traditional short-time Fourier transform (STFT). A long window leads to high frequency resolution and low time resolution. On the other hand, high time resolution requires shorter window, with the expense of low frequency resolution. By choosing the proper elementary function for signal with different spectrum structure, adaptive Gabor representation is able to accommodate both narrowband and wideband signal.

Gabor expansion
In 1946, Dennis Gabor suggested that a signal can be represented in two dimensions, with time and frequency coordinates. And the signal can be expanded into a discrete set of Gaussian elementary signals.

Definition
The Gabor expansion of signal s(t) is defined by this formula:

 

where h(t) is the Gaussian elementary function:

 

Once the Gabor elementary function is determined, the Gabor coefficients can be obtained by the inner product of s(t) and a dual function 

 and  denote the sampling steps of time and frequency and satisfy the criteria

Relationship between Gabor representation and Gabor transform
Gabor transform simply computes the Gabor coefficients  for the signal s(t).

Adaptive expansion
Adaptive signal expansion is defined as

where the coefficients  are obtained by the inner product of the signal s(t) and the elementary function 

Coeffients  represent the similarity between the signal and elementary function.
Adaptive signal decomposition is an iterative operation, aim to find a set of elementary function , which is most similar to the signal's time-frequency structure.
Then find  which has the maximum inner product with signal  and

 

Second, compute the residual:

 

and so on. It will comes out a set of residual, projection, and elementary function for each different p. The energy of the residual will vanish if we keep doing the decomposition.

Energy conservation equation 
If the elementary equation is designed to have a unit energy. Then the energy contain in the residual at the pth stage can be determined by the residual at p+1th stage plus. That is,

similar to the Parseval's theorem in Fourier analysis.

The selection of elementary function is the main task in adaptive signal decomposition. It is natural to choose a Gaussian-type function to achieve the lower bound for the inequality:

 

And

 

is called the adaptive Gabor representation.

Changing the variance value will change the duration of the elementary function (window size), and the center of the elementary function is no longer fixed. By adjusting the center point and variance of the elementary function, we are able to match the signal's local time-frequency feature. The better performance of the adaptation is achieved at the cost of matching process. The trade-off between different window length now become the trade-off between computation time and performance.

See also
Gabor transform
Short-time Fourier transform

References 
M.J. Bastiaans, "Gabor's expansion of a signal into Gaussian elementary signals", Proceedings of the IEEE, vol. 68, Issue:4, pp. 538–539, April 1980
Shie Qian and Dapang Chen, "Signal Representation using adaptive normalized Gaussian functions," Signal Processing, vol. 42, no.3, pp. 687–694, March 1994
Qinye Yin, Shie Qian, and Aigang Feng, "A Fast Refinement for Adaptive Gaussian Chirplet Decomposition," IEEE Transactions on Signal Processing, vol. 50, no.6, pp. 1298–1306, June 2002
Shie Qian, Introduction to Time-Frequency and Wavelet Transforms, Prentice Hall, 2002

Time–frequency analysis